Steve Dennis (born July 25, 1951) is a former gridiron football player.  He played in the Canadian Football League (CFL) for ten years. Dennis played defensive back for the Toronto Argonauts and Saskatchewan Roughriders from 1975 to 1984. He played college football at Grambling State University. He was selected by the Associated Press as a first-team defensive back on the 1972 Little All-America college football team.

References

1951 births
Living people
American players of Canadian football
Canadian football defensive backs
Grambling State Tigers football players
Saskatchewan Roughriders players
Toronto Argonauts players
Players of American football from Shreveport, Louisiana